This is a list of notable past and present residents of the U.S. city of Riverside, California, and its surrounding metropolitan area.  For people whose only connection with the city is attending the University of California, Riverside, see: List of University of California, Riverside people.

Arts

 Marsia Alexander-Clarke, artist
Joshua Jennifer Espinoza, poet
 Darci Kistler, ballerina
 Don O'Neill, architect and water color artist
Joseph J. Sherman, marketing strategist and artist
Jeff Soto, American contemporary artist

Athletics

 Hakim Akbar, football player
 Chris Arreola, professional heavyweight boxer
 Dusty Baker, baseball player for Los Angeles Dodgers and manager of Washington Nationals, Cincinnati Reds, Chicago Cubs and San Francisco Giants
 Austin Barnes, baseball player for Los Angeles Dodgers
 Kenjon Barner, football player; 3x Super Bowl Champion
 Monique Billings, WNBA basketball player for the Atlanta Dream
 Barry Bonds, baseball player for San Francisco Giants and Pittsburgh Pirates, 14-time All-Star, MLB's all-time home run leader
 Bobby Bonds, baseball player for San Francisco Giants and California Angels, 3-time All-Star
 Sean Brewer, football player for Cincinnati Bengals and Atlanta Falcons
 Carlon Brown, basketball player, 2013–14 top scorer in the Israel Basketball Premier League
 Orshawante Bryant, arena football player
 Chris Claiborne, football player for New York Giants
 Tyler Clary, Olympic gold medalist at 2012 London Olympics in 200-meter backstroke
 Frank Corral, football kicker for Los Angeles Rams
 Allen Cunningham, professional poker player
 Alvin Davis, baseball player for Seattle Mariners
 Coby Dietrick, pro basketball player
 Walker Evans, Off-road Motorsports Hall of Fame
 Bubba Franks, NFL tight end for Green Bay Packers
 Candice LeRae, professional wrestler
 David Gilliland, NASCAR driver for Front Row Motorsports
 Dan Gurney, first driver to win in four major categories of motorsports: Grand Prix, Indy Car, NASCAR and Sports Car
 Connor Hamlett, football player
 Kevin Holland – mixed martial artist
 Ken Hubbs, baseball player for Chicago Cubs
 Reed Johnson, baseball player for seven MLB teams
 Adam Kennedy, baseball player for Los Angeles Angels of Anaheim and St. Louis Cardinals
 Bobby Kielty, baseball player for several MLB teams
 Alex Lange, professional baseball pitcher for The Detroit Tigers
 Sammy Knight, football player for New Orleans Saints, Miami Dolphins, and New York Giants
 Lorenz Larkin, mixed martial artist competing at welterweight in the UFC
 Kawhi Leonard, professional basketball player for Los Angeles Clippers, MVP of 2014 NBA Finals
 Jake Marisnick, professional baseball player for Houston Astros.
 Chad Marshall, Major League Soccer player for Columbus Crew
 Chief Meyers, baseball player in early 20th Century
 Cheryl Miller, pro basketball Hall of Famer, player, coach and television commentator, Olympic gold medalist
 Reggie Miller, pro basketball Hall of Famer, played for Indiana Pacers, Olympic gold medalist
 Stephen Murray, BMX rider
 Ryan Navarro, American football long snapper
 Nick Neugebauer, baseball player for Milwaukee Brewers
 Bruce Ogilvie, AMA Hall of Famer, 4-time Baja winner
 Bill Parsons, baseball player for Milwaukee Brewers and Oakland Athletics
 Troy Percival, baseball pitcher for Anaheim Angels and Tampa Bay Rays and 2002 World Series champion
 Garrett Richards, baseball pitcher for the San Diego Padres
 Ronda Rousey, professional wrestler, former mixed martial artist, former UFC bantamweight champion
 Bob Rule, basketball player, NBA All-Star
 Eric Show, baseball pitcher for San Diego Padres
 Tony Snell, basketball player
 Tiffany van Soest, kickboxer
 Daniel Sorensen, professional football player for the New Orleans Saints
 Tyree Washington, track-and-field athlete
 Jacob Webb, pitcher for the Atlanta Braves
 Josh Wise, NASCAR driver for Premium Motorsports
 Cynthia Woodhead (nicknamed "Sippy"), Olympic medalist swimmer and world record holder

Literature

 Joshua Jennifer Espinoza, poet
 Barbara Hambly, novelist
 Laurie McBain, romance novelist
 Susan Straight, novelist, National Book Award nominee

Military

 Mark Edward Bradley (1907–1999), U.S. Air Force pilot and general. Died in Riverside.
 Jesus S. Duran, Vietnam War Medal of Honor recipient
 Salvador J. Lara, World War II Medal of Honor recipient
 John N. Lotz, Air National Guard Brigadier General
 Hoyt S. Vandenberg, Jr., U.S. Air Force Major General
 Ysmael R. Villegas (1924–1945), first Medal of Honor recipient from Riverside County, California, now buried at Riverside National Cemetery as the cemetery's first interment.
Robert F. Worley, (1919–1968), U.S. Air Force Major General and fighter pilot.

Movies/television/media

 Steve Agee, actor, former writer for Jimmy Kimmel Live!
 Ahmed Ahmed, Egyptian comedian and actor
 Jaye Davidson, Oscar-nominated actor
 Elsie Fisher, actress famous for voice of Agnes in Despicable Me.
 Richard Genelle, actor, best known as Ernie of Mighty Morphin Power Rangers and Power Rangers Zeo
 Ciara Hanna, actress (Power Rangers Megaforce)
 Don Imus, nationally syndicated radio talk host
 Sharon Jordan, actress (The Suite Life of Zack & Cody)
 J. F. Lawton, screenwriter (Pretty Woman), director and producer
 Kellie Martin, actress (Mystery Woman)
 Natalie Osman, professional wrestler and valet
 David Petruschin (Raven), drag artist and reality TV star
 Scarlett Pomers, actress (Star Trek: Voyager, Reba)
 Lindsay Ridgeway, actress (Boy Meets World)
 Patrick Seitz, voice actor, (Bleach)
 Alia Shawkat, actress, (Arrested Development)
 Martin Smith, documentarian, journalist, producer, director. Especially known for his work on the PBS Frontline program.
 Johnny Taylor, Jr., stand-up comedian
 Brendon Villegas, competitor on Big Brother 12 and Big Brother 13
 Garrett Wang, actor (Star Trek: Voyager)
 Bert Williams, popular vaudeville entertainer, first black American to take a lead role on the Broadway stage
 Alan Yang, screenwriter, Parks and Recreation, Last Call with Carson Daly, South Park

Music

 Alien Ant Farm, rock band known for their popular cover of the Michael Jackson song "Smooth Criminal".
 Assorted Jelly Beans, ska punk/punk rock band
 Richard Shaw Brown, lead singer with Riverside rock-band The Misunderstood, gemologist, designer and author
 Marc Danzeisen, musician, producer, actor, known for Brady Bunch Movie, and contributions to Def Leppard's music and Gilby Clarke's Pawnshop Guitars
 Twyla Herbert, songwriter
 Etta James, singer, Blues Hall of Fame, Grammy Lifetime Award
 Amy Lee, singer (Evanescence)
 Amy Leverenz, soprano
 A Lighter Shade of Brown, hip-hop duo
 Mitch Lucker, former vocalist of deathcore band Suicide Silence
 Jason Martin, musician (Starflyer 59, Neon Horse, The Brothers Martin, Bon Voyage)
 T. Mills, pop artist, rapper
 Heather Myles, country singer
 Rod Piazza, blues harmonica player
 Gabriel Roth, aka Bosco Mann, composer, bandleader, producer Sharon Jones & the Dap-Kings; co-founder of Daptone Records
 Drew Shirley, member of band Switchfoot
 Skee-Lo, rapper known for hit song "I Wish"
 Billy Vera (born William McCord), singer and actor, best known as frontman of Billy and the Beaters
 Voodoo Glow Skulls, ska punk band formed in 1988
 Michael Wittig, aka "Kalel" the bass player for hard rock band Pillar

Politics

 Stephen W. Cunningham, first UCLA graduate manager, Los Angeles City Council member, 1933–41
 Duncan Hunter, U.S. Representative, 2008 Republican presidential candidate
 Mark Takano, U.S. Representative 
 Ray Lyman Wilbur, president of Stanford University, U.S. Secretary of the Interior

Miscellaneous

 Larry Christiansen, chess Grandmaster
 Edmund C. Hinde, gold miner during the California Gold Rush
 Phil Ivey, professional poker player
 Edmund Jaeger, biologist, instructor at Riverside City College for 30 years
 Trisha Paytas, YouTube 
Rizwan Farook, health inspector and criminal

References

 
Riverside, California
Riverside